Rodolphe Tourville (March 31, 1867 – September 8, 1935) was a politician in the Quebec, Canada.  He served as Member of the Legislative Assembly.

Early life
He was born on March 31, 1867 in Montreal.

He married Berthe Tourville on June 6, 1892, and they had four children.

Provincial politics
Tourville ran as a Liberal candidate to the Legislative Assembly of Quebec in 1912 in the district of Maskinongé.  He won against Conservative incumbent Georges Lafontaine.  He was re-elected in 1916, 1919 and 1923.

He did not run for re-election in 1927.

Death
He died at his home in Outremont on September 8, 1935, and was entombed at the Notre Dame des Neiges Cemetery in Montreal.

Footnotes

1867 births
1935 deaths
Quebec Liberal Party MNAs
Burials at Notre Dame des Neiges Cemetery